The 2020–21 Fresno State Bulldogs men's basketball team represented California State University, Fresno in the 2020–21 NCAA Division I men's basketball season. The Bulldogs were led by third-year head coach Justin Hutson and played their home games at the Save Mart Center as members of the Mountain West Conference.

Previous season
The Bulldogs finished the season 11–19, 7–11 in Mountain West play to finish in a tie for seventh place. They lost in the first round of the Mountain West tournament to Air Force.

Roster

Schedule and results
On November 29, Fresno State paused activities until December 13 due to multiple Covid-19 positive tests, cancelling five games.

|-
!colspan=12 style=| Regular season

|-
!colspan=12 style=| Mountain West tournament

Source

References

Fresno State Bulldogs men's basketball seasons
Fresno State
San Jose State
San Jose State